Peter Lloyd (born 22 September 1949) is an Australian gymnast. He competed at the 1972 Summer Olympics and the 1976 Summer Olympics.

References

1949 births
Living people
Australian male artistic gymnasts
Olympic gymnasts of Australia
Gymnasts at the 1972 Summer Olympics
Gymnasts at the 1976 Summer Olympics
Place of birth missing (living people)